One Bad Pig is a Christian punk and metal crossover band from Austin, Texas, which formed in 1985. The Encyclopedia of Contemporary Christian Music describes them as "quite possibly the most popular hard-punk act ever to arise within the Christian music scene." They were known for their mischief and irreverence on stage, as reflected even in their reunion at Cornerstone in 2000.

Background
The group evolved out of a street ministry led by Carey Womack, who was studying to become a Baptist minister at the time. Several other members also had a background in ministry: Brian Wheeler was an Assembly of God evangelist, and Paul Q-Pek had sung with The Continental Singers. The band originally formed for a one-time-only performance at a local Christian music festival held on Labor Day 1985. Although they have not released any full-length albums of new material since 1991, they have written new songs and have not yet declared that their band is broken up.

According to CCM Magazine a One Bad Pig show was "kind of like a carnival/revival run amok." For instance, at Cornerstone 1990 they were reported to have leapt into water-filled plastic swimming pools and cut down a Christmas tree with a chainsaw. Often during the song "Smash The Guitar", the band would literally smash their guitars onto the stage. In contrast, each performance included an altar call where Carey Womack's preaching was said to have a "hometown passion." The band also placed a heavy emphasis on personal accountability.

Johnny Cash performed guest vocals on One Bad Pig's cover of his song "Man In Black", which One Bad Pig included on their 1991 album, I Scream Sunday. Bob Hartman performed as a guest guitarist on One Bad Pig's cover of his song "Judas Kiss" from his band Petra's More Power To Ya album.

The band was subject to constant criticism from the anti-Christian Rock movement. They were critical of the group for its concert antics, lyrics, and even for their name. According to some, their name evoked stereotypes of punk music and rebellion in a way that was contrary to certain principles of Christianity. One critical group was Dial-the-Truth Ministries, which is affiliated with the King-James-Only Movement. Their widely distributed tract entitled Christian Rock: Blessing or Blasphemy? was critical of the above and their involvement with Johnny Cash, who was attacked separately.

In 2016, One Bad Pig reunited for to record a new album and multiple concerts.

Origin of name
The origin of the band's name was a picture of a pig in a local radio station's advertisement, which Carey commented was one "bad pig". The full story as related in an interview on the "Breakaway Show" (broadcast from radio station KCFV) was that while driving from Austin to the Cornerstone Festival in 1985, Carey and Paul stopped at a Pizza Hut in St. Louis. Local radio station KSHE was running a promotion with Pizza Hut, selling sunglasses with the Pizza Hut logo on one lens and the new KSHE logo on the other. As they were leaving the restaurant, Carey looked at Paul and said "That's one bad pig". Paul replied, "That would be a great name for a punk band! We should form one." So, they did. The next year, One Bad Pig's first album was introduced at Cornerstone.

Related activities

Paul Q-Pek left the band in 1992 and moved to Nashville. In 1996 he released a solo project entitled Touch The Ground. It contained pop stylings similar to that of Peter Gabriel which were, in the words of the Encyclopedia of Contemporary Christian Music, a "shocking departure from his previous porker rock." The album contained several covers, one of Howard Jones's "Things Can Only Get Better", and Pat Terry's "Open the Door." Original lyrics included political satire in "If I were President" and "Capitol Hill", which CCM commented was "less than successful." The album did however contain some songs which charted on Christian radio: "Touch the Ground" and "Things Can Only Get Better" each reached the No. 10 slot in 1995 and 1996 respectively. "I (Surrender)" reached No. 6 in 1996. He returned to the band for their reunion show at the 2000 Cornerstone festival.

Philip Owens and Paul Q-Pek were also in Lust Control, although their identities were anonymous for the band. This arrangement ended when One Bad Pig signed to Myrrh, as its members became contractually blocked from being in other bands.

Discography
1986: A Christian Banned (Review: powermetal.de(German))
1989: Smash (Pure Metal)
1990: Swine Flew (Myrrh Records, Review: CCM Magazine)
1991: I Scream Sunday (Myrrh, Review: powermetal.de (German))
1992: Live: Blow Down the House (Myrrh)
1994: Quintessential One Bad Pig, Vol. 1 (Diadem)
2000: Live at Cornerstone 2000 (One Bad Pig album)|Live at Cornerstone 2000 (M8)
2016: Love U to Death

Members
Carey "Kosher" Womack – lead vocals (often credited as "lead screamer")
Paul Q-Pek – guitar, vocals
Paul Roraback - drums, vocals
Daniel Tucek – bass, vocals
Lee Haley – guitar, vocals

 Former
 Brian "Streak" Wheeler – bass
 Kevin Phelan – bass
 Jon Taylor – drums
 Phil Helms – drums
 Johnny Cash – guest vocals (honorary member)
 Phillip Owens -  drums

References

External links
 
[ One Bad Pig] at Allmusic

Christian punk groups
Christian rock groups from Texas
Crossover thrash groups
Punk rock groups from Texas
Musical groups from Austin, Texas
Musical groups established in 1985
Myrrh Records artists
1985 establishments in Texas